Arceuthobium abietinum is a species of dwarf mistletoe known as fir dwarf mistletoe. It is native to western North America from Washington to New Mexico to northern Mexico, where it lives in coniferous forests as a parasite on various species of fir, particularly white fir, giant fir, and red fir. This is a small shrub which is visible as a network of scaly yellowish stems extending above the bark of its host tree. Most of the mistletoe is located inside the host tree, attached to it via haustoria, which tap the tree for water and nutrients. The leaves of the mistletoe are reduced to knobby scales on its surface. It is dioecious, with male and female mistletoe plants producing spikes of staminate and pistillate flowers, respectively. The fruit is a sticky berry a few millimeters long which explodes to disperse the seeds it contains several meters away from the parent plant and its host tree.

External links
Jepson Manual Treatment
USDA Plants Profile

abietinum